Frank Ebenezer Hill (July 31, 1880–September 23, 1932) was a United States Navy Ship's Cook First Class received the Medal of Honor for actions on board the  off San Diego, California during a boiler explosion which killed 62 enlisted men and one officer.

Medal of Honor citation
Rank and organization: Ship's Cook First Class, U.S. Navy. Born: 31 July 1880, La Grange, Ind. Accredited to: Indiana. G.O. No.: 13, 5 January 1906.

Citation:
On board the U.S.S. Bennington, for extraordinary heroism displayed at the time of the explosion of a boiler of that vessel at San Diego, Calif., 21 July 1905.

He was the son of John C. & Sarah Lucinda (Baker) Hill.

Family genealogist and LaGrange Co. Historical Society

References

United States Navy Medal of Honor recipients
1880 births
People from LaGrange, Indiana
1932 deaths
United States Navy sailors
Non-combat recipients of the Medal of Honor